Natalia Goudkova (née Kletskova) is a Paralympian athlete from Russia competing mainly in category F46 throwing events.

Career 
Natalia competed as part of the Russian team that travelled to the United States for the 1996 Summer Paralympics where she competed in all three throws winning the bronze medal in the javelin. In the 2000 Summer Paralympics in Sydney she won a gold medal in the F46 javelin as well as competing in the F46 discus, shot put and long jump.  In Athens at the 2004 Summer Paralympics she narrowly missed out defending her javelin title in the mixed class F42-36 javelin, coming away with the silver medal and again failing in the F42-46 discus.

References

External links 
  (1996, 1998)
  (2006–2012)

Year of birth missing (living people)
Living people
Paralympic athletes of Russia
Paralympic gold medalists for Russia
Paralympic silver medalists for Russia
Paralympic bronze medalists for Russia
Paralympic medalists in athletics (track and field)
Athletes (track and field) at the 1996 Summer Paralympics
Athletes (track and field) at the 2000 Summer Paralympics
Athletes (track and field) at the 2004 Summer Paralympics
Athletes (track and field) at the 2008 Summer Paralympics
Athletes (track and field) at the 2012 Summer Paralympics
Medalists at the 1996 Summer Paralympics
Medalists at the 2000 Summer Paralympics
Medalists at the 2004 Summer Paralympics
Medalists at the 2012 Summer Paralympics
Russian female javelin throwers
Javelin throwers with limb difference
Paralympic javelin throwers